This is a list of the songs that reached number one in Mexico in 1966, according to Billboard magazine with data provided by Audiomusica.

Popular singer Javier Solís died on April 19. He posthumously earned his eleventh and twelfth number-one hits Una limosna and Amigo organillero.

Chart history

By country of origin
Number-one artists:

Number-one compositions (it denotes the country of origin of the song's composer[s]; in case the song is a cover of another one, the name of the original composition is provided in parentheses):

See also
1966 in music

References

Sources
Print editions of the Billboard magazine from January 1, 1966 to January 7, 1967.

1966 in Mexico
1966 record charts
Lists of number-one songs in Mexico